Lori Otter (née Easley; born January 4, 1967) is an American educator, author, and former beauty queen who served as First Lady of Idaho from 2007 to 2019. Otter is married to the former Governor of Idaho, C. L. "Butch" Otter. She was crowned Miss Idaho USA in 1991.

Career 
Otter won the Miss Idaho USA title in 1991 and represented Idaho in the Miss USA 1991 pageant broadcast live from Wichita, Kansas in February 1991.

Otter taught K-12 physical education, English, and health. She coached girls basketball and volleyball at the junior high and high school levels for 13 years, in the Meridian School District in Meridian, Idaho.

Personal life 
During her year as Miss Idaho USA, she met Butch Otter, who was then serving as Lieutenant Governor of Idaho. She returned to Idaho in 1995 after teaching and coaching in Arizona. Lori and Butch were married in Meridian, Idaho on August 18, 2006. Butch Otter was elected Governor of Idaho in November 2006, and, upon taking office two months later, Lori Easley Otter became First Lady of Idaho.

A former marathon runner, Otter jogs and rides horses. Otter currently resides in Star.

References

External links

1967 births
Schoolteachers from Idaho
American women educators
Boise State University alumni
Living people
First Ladies and Gentlemen of Idaho
Miss USA 1991 delegates
Northwest Nazarene University alumni
People from Meridian, Idaho
People from Pensacola, Florida
People from Star, Idaho
20th-century American people
21st-century American women